

The following is a list of New Hampshire state agencies—government agencies of the U.S. state of New Hampshire. Entries are listed alphabetically per their first distinguishing word (e.g. the New Hampshire Department of Agriculture, Markets, and Food is listed under "A" for Agriculture), with subordinate agencies listed under their parent agency.

A
New Hampshire Department of Administrative Services
New Hampshire Commission on Aging
New Hampshire Department of Agriculture, Markets, and Food

B
New Hampshire Banking Department
New Hampshire Boxing and Wrestling Commission
New Hampshire Department of Business and Economic Affairs
New Hampshire Division of Economic Development
New Hampshire Division of Travel and Tourism Development
New Hampshire Business Finance Authority

C
Community College System of New Hampshire
Great Bay Community College (Portsmouth, Rochester)
Lakes Region Community College (Laconia)
Manchester Community College
Nashua Community College
NHTI – Concord's Community College
River Valley Community College (Claremont, Keene)
White Mountains Community College (Berlin, Littleton, Woodsville)
New Hampshire Community Development Finance Authority
New Hampshire Department of Corrections

E
New Hampshire Department of Education
New Hampshire State Board of Education
New Hampshire Higher Education Commission
New Hampshire Council for Teacher Education
New Hampshire Employment Security
New Hampshire Economic and Labor Market Information Bureau
New Hampshire Department of Environmental Services
New Hampshire Geological Survey
New Hampshire Pollution Prevention Program
New Hampshire Water Council
New Hampshire Wetlands Council
Executive Council of New Hampshire

F
New Hampshire Film and Television Office
New Hampshire Fish and Game Department

G
Governor of New Hampshire
New Hampshire Governor’s Commission on Alcohol and other Drugs
New Hampshire Governor’s Commission on Cryptocurrencies and Digital Assets
New Hampshire Governor's Commission on Disability
New Hampshire Governor's Commission on the Humane Treatment of Animals

H
New Hampshire Department of Health & Human Services
New Hampshire Housing Finance Authority
New Hampshire Commission for Human Rights

I
New Hampshire Office of Information Technology
New Hampshire Insurance Department

J
New Hampshire Department of Justice
Attorney General of New Hampshire

L
New Hampshire Department of Labor
New Hampshire Liquor Commission
New Hampshire Lottery Commission
New Hampshire Gaming Regulatory Oversight Authority

M
New Hampshire Department of Military Affairs and Veterans Services
Adjutant General of New Hampshire
New Hampshire State Veterans Council
New Hampshire Veterans Cemetery
New Hampshire Veterans Home

N
New Hampshire National Guard
New Hampshire Air National Guard
New Hampshire Army National Guard
New Hampshire Department of Natural and Cultural Resources
New Hampshire Division of Historical Resources
New Hampshire Division of Forests and Lands
New Hampshire Division of Parks and Recreation
New Hampshire State Council on the Arts
New Hampshire State Library

P
Pease Development Authority
Pease International Tradeport
New Hampshire Division of Ports and Harbors
New Hampshire Police Standards and Training Council
New Hampshire Office of Professional Licensure and Certification

Health Profession Boards
New Hampshire Office of Licensed Allied Health Professionals
New Hampshire Board of Barbering, Cosmetology, and Esthetics
New Hampshire Board of Dental Examiners
New Hampshire Board of Registration of Funeral Directors and Embalmers
New Hampshire State Board of Medicine
New Hampshire Board of Mental Health Practice
New Hampshire Board of Nursing
New Hampshire Board of Registration in Optometry
New Hampshire Board of Pharmacy
New Hampshire Board of Registration in Podiatry
New Hampshire Board of Veterinary Medicine

Technical Profession Boards
New Hampshire Board of Accountancy
New Hampshire Family Mediator Certification Board
New Hampshire Guardian ad Litem Board
New Hampshire Board of Manufactured Housing
New Hampshire Mechanical Safety and Licensing Board
New Hampshire Real Estate Appraiser Board

New Hampshire Public Employee Labor Relations Board
New Hampshire Public Utilities Commission

R
New Hampshire Real Estate Commission
New Hampshire Retirement System
New Hampshire Department of Revenue Administration

S
New Hampshire Department of Safety
New Hampshire Building Code Review Board
New Hampshire Bureau of Hearings
New Hampshire Office of Highway Safety
New Hampshire Motor Vehicle Industry Board
New Hampshire Road Toll Bureau
New Hampshire Bureau of Marine Patrol
New Hampshire State Police
D.A.R.E. New Hampshire
New Hampshire Department of State 
New Hampshire Secretary of State
New Hampshire Board of Auctioneers
New Hampshire Office of Strategic Initiatives
New Hampshire Floodplain Management Program
New Hampshire Fuel Assistance Program
New Hampshire State Data Center
New Hampshire Weatherization Assistance Program

T
New Hampshire Board of Tax and Land Appeals
New Hampshire Department of Transportation
New Hampshire State Treasury
New Hampshire Abandoned Property Division

External links
State Government Agencies at NH.gov
Rules Listed by State Agency at NH General Court (state legislature)

New Hampshire

New Hampshire